Cassia O'Reilly (known professionally as Cosha and formerly known as Bonzai) is an Irish singer-songwriter and music producer.

Background
O'Reilly was born in Indiana, United States, and raised in Ireland, between County Wicklow and Dublin. Her African-American mother was a singer and her Irish father was a drummer. She moved to London at age 17.

Career
O'Reilly has worked with Eg White, Mura Masa and Rostam and Justin Raisen and toured with Flume.

Discography

Albums

Mixtapes

Extended plays

Singles

as lead artist
 "I Did" (2016) (as Bonzai)
 "I Feel Alright" (2017) (as Bonzai)
 "Do You Wanna Dance" (2018) (as Cosha)
 "Luv" (2018) (as Cosha)
 "Flacko" (2018) (as Cosha)
 "No Kink in the Wire" (2020) (as Cosha)
 "Berlin Air" (2020) (as Cosha)
 "Lapdance from Asia" (2021) (as Cosha, featuring Shygirl)
 "Tighter" (2021) (as Cosha, featuring Coby Sey)
"Run the Track" (2021) (as Cosha)

as featured artist
 "What If I Go?" (2016) 
 "Nuggets" (2017) 
 "Till the World Falls" (2018)

Songwriting credits
 "Porsche" (2017)

References

External links

Living people
21st-century Irish women singers
Irish people of African-American descent
Irish women singer-songwriters
Musicians from County Dublin
Black Irish people
1996 births